Jarrod Alexander Cooper (born March 31, 1978) is a former American football safety with the Oakland Raiders and Carolina Panthers. He was drafted by the Panthers in the fifth round of the 2001 NFL Draft. He played college football at Kansas State.

Early life
Cooper played football and ran track and field for Pearland High School in Texas. He was an All-state selection in football as a senior and was a four-year letterman in track and field, excelling in the long jump, triple jump, and the 110-meter and 300-meter hurdles.

College career
Cooper played college football at Kansas State where he was an All-Big 12 selection all four years. He was elected team captain as a junior and senior. After leaving Kansas State, he ranked 11th in school history in tackles.

Professional career

Carolina Panthers
Cooper was drafted by the Carolina Panthers in the fifth round (143rd overall) of the 2001 NFL Draft and played in Super Bowl XXXVIII.

Oakland Raiders
Cooper joined the Oakland Raiders on October 29, 2004 after being claimed off waivers.
In 2005, he won the Ed Block Courage Award chosen by his teammates. He was also a team captain for the 2006 season.

Cooper was released by the Raiders prior to the 2007 season after failing a league mandated drug test. He was re-signed not long after he served his suspension, but was placed on season-ending injured reserve on December 17 with a torn ACL.

He was later released on August 25, 2008 and did not play during the 2008 and 2009 seasons.

Cooper has since revealed that head injuries (causing recurrent, debilitating migraines) and an uncertain medical prognosis were reasons for his "abrupt" retirement from the Oakland Raiders.

NFL statistics

Personal life
In 2007 Cooper began volunteering at the Oakland Animal Shelter in Oakland California.  He quickly became an integral part of the shelter's team of staff and volunteers, often spending hours walking the dogs, cleaning kennels, and performing various improvement tasks around the shelter.  Eventually he donated funds for the construction of outdoor exercise runs for the dogs named "the Coop" He subsequently cofounded Help Code 597, a non-profit dedicated to helping the animals of Oakland.
As of 2011, Cooper continued as a regular volunteer at the shelter.

References

External links
Oakland Raiders bio

Players of American football from Akron, Ohio
American football safeties
Kansas State Wildcats football players
Carolina Panthers players
Oakland Raiders players
Pearland High School alumni
1978 births
Living people
Ed Block Courage Award recipients